Comet Austin may mean:
 C/1982 M1 (a.k.a. 1982 VI, 1982g)
 C/1984 N1 (a.k.a. 1984 XIII, 1984i)
 C/1989 X1 (a.k.a. 1990 V, 1989c1)